Paraloricaria commersonoides is a species of armored catfish native to Argentina and Uruguay where it is found in the Uruguay River basin.

References
 

Loricariini
Fish of South America
Fish of Argentina
Fish of Uruguay
Taxa named by Garibaldi José Devincenzi
Fish described in 1943